Troy Ayne Loney (born September 21, 1963) is a Canadian former professional ice hockey left winger. He was part owner of the Youngstown Phantoms of the USHL before selling it to Black Bear Sports Group Inc. in June 2018.

Career
Loney was born in Bow Island, Alberta. He was a member of the 1991 and 1992 Pittsburgh Penguin Stanley Cup champions. He was claimed by the Mighty Ducks of Anaheim at the Expansion Draft in June 1993 and was named the team's first captain. He retired following the lockout-shortened 1995 season, which he split between the Rangers and Islanders. In 624 NHL games Loney recorded 87 goals, 110 assists, 197 points, and 1091 penalty minutes.

Career statistics

References

External links

1963 births
Baltimore Skipjacks players
Canadian ice hockey left wingers
Ice hockey people from Alberta
Lethbridge Broncos players
Living people
Muskegon Lumberjacks players
Mighty Ducks of Anaheim players
National Hockey League broadcasters
New York Rangers players
People from the County of Forty Mile No. 8
Pittsburgh Penguins announcers
Pittsburgh Penguins draft picks
Pittsburgh Penguins players
Stanley Cup champions